A German heavy tank battalion ( was a battalion-sized World War II tank unit of the German Army (1935–1945), equipped with Tiger I, and later Tiger II, heavy tanks.  Originally intended to fight on the offensive during breakthrough operations, the German late-war realities required it to be used in a defensive posture by providing heavy fire support and counter-attacking enemy armored breakthroughs, often organised into ad hoc Kampfgruppen.

The German heavy tank battalions destroyed a total  of 9,850 enemy tanks for the loss of only 1,715 of their own, a kill/loss ratio of 5.74. The 1,715 German losses also include non-combat tank write-offs.

Formation 
Early formation units experimented to find the correct combination of heavy Tiger tanks supported by either medium Panzer III tanks or reconnaissance elements. In 1942 this consisted of 20 Tigers and 16 Panzer IIIs, composed of two companies, each with four platoons of two Tigers and two Panzer IIIs. Each company commander would have an additional Tiger, and battalion command would have another two.

Later formations had a standard organization of 45 Tiger Tanks, composed of three companies of 14 Tigers each, plus three command vehicles.  Maintenance troubles and the mechanical unreliability of the Tigers posed a continuous problem, so often the units would field a smaller number of combat-ready tanks.

The limited number of these heavy tanks, plus their specialized role in either offensive or defensive missions, meant they were rarely permanently assigned to a single division or corps, but shuffled around according to war circumstances.

Organisation structure 
The organisation structure of a German heavy Panzer battalion in 1943, on example of the schwere Panzerabteilung 508, was as follows.

staff / 
staff company (three tanks) / Stabskompanie
communications platoon / Nachrichtenzug
armoured reconnaissance platoon (on IFV) / gepanzerter Aufklärungszug
area reconnaissance platoon / Erkundungszug (ErkdZug)
engineer platoon / Pionierzug (PiZug)
anti-aircraft platoon / Fliegerabwehrzug (FlakZug)
1st – 3rd Panzer company (14 tanks each) / 1. – 3. Panzerkompanie
company detachment (two tanks) / Kompanietrupp
1st – 3rd Panzer platoon (four tanks each) / 1. – 3. Panzerzug
medical service / Sanitätsdienst
vehicle repair detachment / Kfz. Instandsetzungstrupp
combat train I / Gefechtstross I 
combat train II / Gefechtstross II
baggage train / Gepäcktross
workshop company / Werkstattkompanie
1st and 2nd workshop platoon / 1. and 2. Werkstattzug
recovery platoon / Bergezug
armorer detachment / Waffenmeisterei
communications detachment / Funkmeisterei
spare part detachment / Ersatzteiltrupp

Army units 
By the end of the war, the following heavy panzer detachments had been created.  Early units were re-built several times by the end of the war.

Independent units attached to the German Army (Heer) were:
 501st Heavy Panzer Battalion
 502nd Heavy Panzer Battalion
 503rd Heavy Panzer Battalion
 504th Heavy Panzer Battalion
 505th Heavy Panzer Battalion
 506th Heavy Panzer Battalion
 507th Heavy Panzer Battalion
 508th Heavy Panzer Battalion
 509th Heavy Panzer Battalion
 510th Heavy Panzer Battalion
 511th Heavy Panzer Battalion
 301st Heavy Panzer Battalion (radio control)

SS units
Units attached to the Waffen-SS were:

101st SS Heavy Panzer Battalion renamed in 1944, as SS Heavy Panzer Battalion 501, part of I SS Panzer Corps
102nd SS Heavy Panzer Battalion renamed in 1944, as SS Heavy Panzer Battalion 502 (schwere SS-Panzerabteilung 502), part of II SS Panzer Corps
103rd SS Heavy Panzer Battalion renamed in 1944, as SS Heavy Panzer Battalion 503 (schwere SS-Panzerabteilung 503), part of III (Germanic) SS Panzer Corps
104th SS Heavy Panzer Battalion (schwere SS-Panzerabteilung 104) was planned 22 October 1943, for IV SS Panzer Corps, but was never formed

Combat performance

Tank losses include losses inflicted other than by enemy tanks. Also, many tanks were abandoned by their crews due to a lack of fuel, ammunition or breakdown, especially at the end of war.

See also
Organisation of a SS Panzer Division
Panzer Division

Notes

References

 

 *